The North Salina Street Historic District is a national historic district located on the north side of Syracuse, New York.  It encompasses 85 contributing buildings in a section of Syracuse that was home to many German immigrants in the 19th century, and Italian immigrants after the turn of the 20th century.  It developed between about 1860 and 1960, and includes examples of Federal, Greek Revival, and Late Victorian style architecture.  Notable buildings include Assumption Church (c. 1880) designed by Horatio N. White and Convent (c. 1900), Walier Building (1890), and the Albany Block (c. 1896).

It was added to the National Register of Historic Places in 1985. In 2019 its boundaries were increased to their present location.

References

Historic districts in Onondaga County, New York
Greek Revival architecture in New York (state)
Victorian architecture in New York (state)
Federal architecture in New York (state)
Historic districts on the National Register of Historic Places in New York (state)
National Register of Historic Places in Syracuse, New York